Viscount Ullswater, of Campsea Ashe in the County of Suffolk, is a title in the Peerage of the United Kingdom. It was created in 1921 for James Lowther upon his retirement as Speaker of the House of Commons. He was the eldest son of the Hon. William Lowther, third son of the Hon. Henry Lowther, second son of William Lowther, 1st Earl of Lonsdale (see Earl of Lonsdale and Lowther Baronets for earlier history of the family). The first Viscount lived to the age of 93, and was pre-deceased by both his eldest son the Hon. Christopher Lowther, a Conservative politician, and his eldest son's eldest son John Arthur Lowther (1910–1942) (who was Private Secretary to Prince George, Duke of Kent and was killed in the same air crash as him), the title being inherited by his seven-year-old great-grandson, the second and current Viscount, in an extremely rare instance of a great-grandson succeeding his great-grandfather in a peerage. The second Viscount held office in the Conservative administrations of Margaret Thatcher and John Major and since 2003 he has been one of the ninety elected hereditary peers that remain in the House of Lords after the passing of the House of Lords Act 1999.

Two of the first Viscount's younger brothers also gained distinction. Sir Gerard Lowther, 1st Baronet, was a diplomat and Sir Cecil Lowther a soldier and politician.

Viscounts Ullswater (1921)
James William Lowther, 1st Viscount Ullswater (1855–1949)
Hon. Christopher William Lowther (1887–1935)
Hon. John Arthur Lowther (1910–1942)
Nicholas James Christopher Lowther, 2nd Viscount Ullswater (b. 1942)

The heir apparent is the present holder's eldest son, Hon. Benjamin James Lowther (b. 1975).

See also
Earl of Lonsdale
Lowther Baronets

Notes

References 
Kidd, Charles, Williamson, David (editors). Debrett's Peerage and Baronetage (1990 edition). New York: St Martin's Press, 1990, 

Viscountcies in the Peerage of the United Kingdom
Viscount
Peerages created for the Speaker of the House of Commons
Noble titles created in 1921
Noble titles created for UK MPs